Soulburn is a Dutch death metal/black-doom band.

History
Originally Soulburn emerged after a first demise of Dutch death metal band Asphyx in the mid-90s, when founding members Eric Daniels (guitars) and Bob Bagchus (drums) looked for a separate outlet to unleash their mutual obsession with Bathory and Venom. After a demo and the cult Feeding On Angels debut album via Century Media Records in 1998, which featured Wannes Gubbels (Pentacle) on vocals and bass, Soulburn were put to rest when Asphyx returned with On the Wings of Inferno in 2000 with the same line-up.

16 years after their debut album, Soulburn resurfaced with their new line-up featuring the core of Eric Daniels (guitars) and Bob Bagchus (drums), teaming with Twan van Geel (Legion Of The Damned) as vocalist/bassist and Remco Kreft (Nailgun Massacre) as second guitarist to create their second album, The Suffocating Darkness. It was recorded with Harry Wijering (Harrow Productions) and mixing and mastering duties were taken over by Dan Swanö and Unisound Studios. The front cover was designed by Timo Ketola (Watain, Deathspell Omega, etc.) and additional art was provided by Roberto Toderico (Asphyx, etc.). A video clip for the song “In Suffocating Darkness”, off The Suffocating Darkness, can be seen online.

Soulburn released a split 7-inch EP with Desaster in 2015 featuring the new track “The Lats Monument Of God”. Soulburn released their third album Earthless Pagan Spirit on November 18, 2016, via Century Media Records. This album was recorded in The Netherlands at Harrow Studio as well as Double Noise Studio and then mixed and mastered by Magnus "Devo" Andersson at Endarker Studio in Sweden (Marduk, Ofermod, etc.).

In June 2018, Bob Bagchus departed Soulburn. He was replaced by Marc Verhaar.

Soulburn released their fourth album, Noa’s D'ark in November 2020.

Band members

Current members
 Eric Daniels - guitars (1996-1999, 2013–present)
 Twan van Geel - bass, vocals (2014–present)
 Remco Kreft - guitars (2014–present)
 Marc Verhaar - drums (2018–present)

Past members
 Wannes Gubbels - bass, vocals (1997-1999)
 Bob Bagchus - drums (1996-1999, 2013–2018)

Discography

Studio albums
Feeding on Angels (1998, Century Media Records)
The Suffocating Darkness (2014, Century Media Records)
Earthless Pagan Spirit (2016, Century Media Records)
NOA'S D'ARK (2020, Century Media Records)

Singles (7-inch)
 Split 7" with Desaster (2015, Cyclone Empire Records)
 Carpe Noctem" 2-track (2018, Floga Records)

Extended plays (12-inch)
 Demo 1996 (2016, Flogga Records)

Demos
 Demo 1996 (1996, self-released)

References

External links

 Interview at Terrorizer

Dutch black metal musical groups